Sonia Mary Cole (née Myers) (1918 – 1982) was an English geologist, archaeologist, anthropologist and author.

Biography
Sonia Cole was born Sonya Syers in Westminster, London,  her mother marrying the 5th Earl of Enniskillen as her second husband, and Sonia herself marrying his nephew, the 6th Earl. Cole worked for the British Museum, and conducted extensive fieldwork in Africa. She was a close friend and colleague of Mary Leakey, who wrote her obituary.

David Lowry Cole, 6th Earl of Enniskillen (1918–1989) was divorced from his first wife Sonia in 1955. By her, he had issue one son and one daughter.

Cole is most remembered for her work Races of Man, which drew heavily from Carleton Coon.

Works
An Outline of the Geology of Kenya (1950)
The Prehistory of East Africa  (1954, 2nd ed. 1958, rev. ed. 1964)
Races of Man (1963, 2nd ed. 1965)
The Neolithic Age (1970)
Leakey's Luck (1975)

References

1910s births
1982 deaths
Cole family (Anglo-Irish aristocracy)
English anthropologists
British women anthropologists
20th-century British geologists
British women geologists
English writers
20th-century British women scientists
British women archaeologists